Liepupe is a village in Latvia, in Liepupe parish of Limbaži Municipality. The village is located 5 km from the Baltic Sea coast Metsepole Plain and Seaside Lowlands. The name of the village and the river Liepupe flowing through it comes from the Latvianized ancient Livs name  Pernigele , distortion of the words "parnarna", "yogur river", which also means "Pärnu River" in Latvian.

History 
The village was founded in the 17th century next to the Liepupe estate. Liepupe Manor, built in 1751, is one of the best preserved baroque manors in Vidzeme.

Culture 
The Baltic Acoustic Music Festival, the Silver Gull, is hold in Liepupe since 2012.
Liepupe has a library.
Liepupe village church is located in Jelgavkrast village.

See also 
Liepupe Manor

References

Villages in Latvia
Limbaži Municipality
Vidzeme